Recreation Park in Long Beach, California is a large  recreation center in the southeast section of the city.

The park has a lawn bowling green, dog park, casting pond, and playground. Special facilities include the Billie Jean King Tennis Center, and the Joe Rodgers Field and Blair Field baseball facilities. There are both 18-hole and 9-hole golf courses. The 18-hole course is one of the busiest in the nation.

The park's community center offers a wide range of  classes for the community. There is also a reserved picnic site for large picnic groups.

Recreation Park also holds a number of special events sponsored by the City of Long Beach, such as the one for Cinco de Mayo.

South of the 9-hole golf course is the Colorado Lagoon, another city park.

The Recreation Park Bandshell was designated as a City of Long Beach historic landmark in 1991.

References

External links

Billie Jean King Tennis Center 
Blair Field
Recreation Park South 18-hole golf course

Geography of Long Beach, California
Landmarks in Long Beach, California
Dog parks in the United States